Michael Mayhew (born 22 January 1987 in Auckland, New Zealand) is a rugby union player for London Irish in the Aviva Premiership. He plays as a hooker.

Mayhew moved to England to join Newcastle Falcons in 2011, alongside his brother Richard.

References

External links
London Irish Profile

Living people
1987 births
New Zealand rugby union players
London Irish players
Wasps RFC players
Newcastle Falcons players
North Harbour rugby union players
Waikato rugby union players
Rugby union hookers
Rugby union players from Auckland
New Zealand expatriate rugby union players
New Zealand expatriate sportspeople in England
Expatriate rugby union players in England
Leeds Tykes players